is a passenger railway station located in the city of Takashima, Shiga Prefecture, Japan, operated by the West Japan Railway Company (JR West). As a key station of the Kosei Line, the station has a yard on its south side.

Lines
Previously most of the Special Rapid Service trains from the JR Kyoto Line turned at this station until 2006 when most Special Rapid Service trains were extended to Tsuruga Station. As of 2011, there is one such train in the morning that terminates at the station. The extension of the services to the north section required coupling and releasing of cars at this station since platforms of Ōmi-Shiotsu Station and beyond can only handle 4-car trains. In order to facilitate these works, a signal was newly added to the track 2 of the station.

Station layout
The station is elevated with two elevated island platforms each capable of serving 12-car trains, as well as sidetracks for passing trains. The station provides the on-line ticket reservation service. While automatic ticket gates have not been installed, ICOCA and other IC cards can be processed via a stand alone machine without the need to present to a staff member. Regular tickets will need to be processed by the staffed window; during rush hour times, an additional staff member is located outside the window to process tickets quickly.

Platforms

Adjacent Stations

History
The station opened on 20 July 1974 as a station on the Japan National Railway (JNR). The station became part of the West Japan Railway Company on 1 April 1987 due to the privatization and dissolution of the JNR. 

Station numbering was introduced in March 2018 with Ōmi-Imazu being assigned station number JR-B14.

Passenger statistics
In fiscal 2019, the station was used by an average of 1989 passengers daily (boarding passengers only).

Surrounding area
 Imazu Port
 Imazu Vories Museum
 Imazu Church
 Otsu Family Court Takashima Branch Office
 Takashima Summary Court
 Takashima City Hall (formerly Imazu Cultural Arts Hall)

See also
List of railway stations in Japan

References

External links

Railway stations in Shiga Prefecture
Railway stations in Japan opened in 1974
Kosei Line
Takashima, Shiga